Skalø is a small Danish island, with an area of 1.06 km2 and a population of 11 located south west of Zealand in the Baltic Sea.

References 

Danish islands in the Baltic
Islands of Denmark
Geography of Lolland Municipality